The Salzburgring is a  motorsport race track located in Plainfeld, east of Salzburg.

Key Facts 
Track Length                     

Bends                                15

Straights                            4 (the longest being at start/finish which is 750m)

Incline                                maximum 3,8%

Decline                              maximum 1,8%

Altitude difference             ca 

Altitude                               to 

Boxes                                31

History

1968              Groundbreaking ceremony

1969              Opening with a combined car and motorbike race

1970              First Grand Prix of Austria for Motorbikes

1971              First FIM Motorbike World Championship race

2012-2014    Touring Car World Championships

2013              First Electric Love Festival which, in 2018, brought 180,000 attendees to the track

2019              50thanniversary

The race track was first opened in 1969. Lying in a narrow, alpine valley, it has a rather simple layout, with two long straights plus the sweeping and fast "Fahrerlagerkurve" ("paddock turn") at the bottom, and the narrow "Nockstein-Kehre" on the top. In spite of its simple layout, it garnered a fearsome reputation for the high speeds reached on the straights and the "Fahrerlagerkurve". Michael Doohan describes the section between 7 and 10 as his all time favorite piece of racetrack, likening it to "threading a motorcycle through the eye of a needle at  whilst banging fairings with your competitors with armco barriers on each side". He continues "Sure it was fast and dangerous, but also enormous fun. To me it's what motorcycle racing is all about".

The Salzburgring track hosts touring car races like the German ADAC Procar Series, Deutsche Produktionswagen Meisterschaft, Deutsche Tourenwagen Challenge, Super Tourenwagen Cup and the European Touring Car Championship. It was also the home of the Austrian motorcycle Grand Prix from 1971 to 1994, except for the 1980 and 1992 seasons. Giacomo Agostini and Angel Nieto are the all-time leaders in motorcycle Grand Prix victories at the circuit, with six wins apiece. Sidecar motorcycle races were also held at the venue. The track has also hosted the Oldtimer Grand Prix as well as during the last years a "Rupert Hollaus Memorial" organized by Ex-Grand Prix motorcycle and sidecar racer, Wolfgang Stropek. In 2008, the circuit played host to the then one-off European Touring Car Cup, with the event being won by Michel Nykjaer.

Layout history

Events

 Current
 June: Porsche Sprint Challenge Central Europe
 September: Histo-Cup Austria

 Former
 ADAC TCR Germany Touring Car Championship (2022)
 Deutsche Rennsport Meisterschaft (1979–1982)
 Deutsche Tourenwagen Meisterschaft (1987)
 European Formula 5000 Championship (1970)
 European Formula Two Championship (1972–1976)
 European Superbike Championship (1990–1991, 1995)
 European Touring Car Championship (1970–1981, 1983–1985)
 European Touring Car Cup (2008, 2010–2014)
 Formula 750 (1977)
 Grand Prix motorcycle racing Austrian motorcycle Grand Prix (1971–1979, 1981–1991, 1993–1994)
 SEAT León Eurocup (2014)
 Sidecar World Championship (1971–1979, 1981–1991, 2005–2007)
 Super Tourenwagen Cup (1994–1999)
 Superbike World Championship (1995)
 TCR International Series (2015–2017)
 V8Star Series (2001–2002)
 World Touring Car Championship FIA WTCC Race of Austria (2012–2014)

Lap Records

The official race lap records at the Salzburgring are listed as:

Results

Motorcycle Grand Prix
 1971 500cc: Giacomo Agostini - MV Agusta
 1975 500cc: Hideo Kanaya - Yamaha 	
 1978 500cc: Kenny Roberts - Yamaha 	
 1983 500cc: Kenny Roberts - Yamaha
 1987 500cc: Wayne Gardner - Honda
 1990 500cc: Kevin Schwantz - Suzuki
 1994 500cc: Michael Doohan - Honda

European Touring Car Championship

Notes

References

External links
Salzburgring
The Oldtimer Grand Prix
Salzburgring in Google Maps

Superbike World Championship circuits
Grand Prix motorcycle circuits
Motorsport venues in Austria
Sports venues in Salzburg (state)
Tourist attractions in Salzburg (state)
World Touring Car Championship circuits